Petretsovo is a rural locality (a settlement) in Cherdynsky District, Perm Krai, Russia. The population was 171 as of 2010.

Geography 
Petretsovo is located 190 km northeast of Cherdyn (the district's administrative centre) by road. Rusinovo is the nearest rural locality.

References 

Rural localities in Cherdynsky District